is the debut single of the J-pop group Yuma Nakayama w/ B.I.Shadow and NYC, which was temporary unit.

Track listing

Limited Edition A
 CD
  (Nakayama Yuma w/ B.I.Shadow)
 NYC (NYCboys)
 Dial Up (NYC)
 DVD
  Music Clip (PV)
 Making
 Jacket Shooting
 「NYC」@International Forum 2009.6.7

Limited Edition B
CD
  (Nakayama Yuma w/ B.I.Shadow)
 NYC (NYCboys)
 Dial Up (NYC)
  DVD
 NYC Music Clip (PV)
 Making
 Jacket Shooting
 「NYC」@International Forum 2009.6.7

Regular Edition
 CD
  (Nakayama Yuma w/ B.I.Shadow)
 NYC (NYCboys)
  (NYCboys)
  (Original Karaoke)
 NYC (Original Karaoke)

Charts

Sales and certifications

References

2009 singles
J-pop songs